Tondibia is a village in Niger, north west of Niamey.

Populated places in Niger